Josep Mir i Llussà (Spanish José Mir y Llussá, also José Mir y Lusa) (–1764) was a Catalan composer, and maestro de capilla at Segovia, then Valladolid and Madrid.  His works are preserved in copies in the Royal Convent of La Encarnación and in archives in the Americas. Little is known about the life of Jose Mir y Llussa, but his pieces were often performed in private palaces along with those of Manuel Pla.

Works, editions, and recordings
His surviving choral works include:
 Missa a 8 in D major
 Stabat Mater in G minor
 Quomodo obscuratum est
 Lauda Jerusalem - Psalm in A minor

References

1700 births
1764 deaths
Composers from Catalonia
18th-century composers
18th-century male musicians
Spanish male musicians